Dale Womersley (28 July 1860 – 22 August 1942) was a British tennis player active in the late 19th century. In major tournaments of the time he played at the 1880 Wimbledon Championships where he was beaten in the second round by William Renshaw. Between 1879 and 1882 he won three singles titles.

Career
In 1879 Womersely played his first tournament at the Essex County Cricket Club Tournament at Leyton, where he reached the final, but lost to his brother Nalton Wormersly. In 1880 he won his first title at the Essex County Cricket Club Tournament against Richard. C. Ball.  The same year he won a second title at the Devonshire Park Championships at Eastbourne.  

In the summer of 1880 he played at Wimbledon Championships where he progressed to second round, but was defated by William Renshaw. In September 1881 he competed at the South of England Championships.  The same year he won his third and final title at the Essex Championships at Brentwood, Essex, defeating Champion Branfil Russell, Charles Walder Grinstead, Edward North Buxton, anf finally his brother Nalton on his way to the title.

Work and Family
Dale Womersley was the brother of fellow lawn tennis player Nalton Womersley and a stockbroker by profession.

References

External links
 ATP Tour:Profile
 Wimbledon/Player profile

1860 births
1942 deaths
19th-century male tennis players
English male tennis players
Tennis people from Essex
British male tennis players